Suzanne Jackson (born 1944) is an American visual artist, gallery owner, poet, dancer, educator, and set designer; with a career spanning five decades. Her work has been exhibited in museums and galleries around the world. Since the late 1960s, Jackson has dedicated her life to studio art with additional participation in theatre, teaching, arts administration, community life, and social activism. Jackson's oeuvre includes poetry, dance, theater, costume design, paintings (both two- and three-dimensional), prints, and drawings.

Jackson has spent time throughout her career teaching students and influencing future generations of artists and culture creators, as well as building and participating in close-knit art communities with peer artists and thinkers. She worked in Los Angeles during the 1960s to 1980s, founding Gallery 32, and exhibiting additional work at the Ankrum Gallery. During the 1980s she lived in Idyllwild, California teaching and creating art. She also worked at Yale University, and in New York and Philadelphia in the 1990s. She worked in the Savannah, Georgia art community, from 1996 to 2009.

Early life and education
Jackson was born in 1944 in Saint Louis, Missouri. Her family moved to San Francisco, California, when she was nine months old. Jackson lived in San Francisco until she was eight years old, after which she was raised in the city of Fairbanks, Alaska, from 1952 to 1961. She graduated from Monroe Catholic High School in 1961. As a teenager in Alaska, she became a member of the National Audubon Society which influenced some of the content of her work from a young age. She was also the first African American to attend the National 4-H Congress in Chicago in 1960, which helped her receive scholarships and allowed her to attend college. She received the World Peace, Humane Society, and Kindness to Animals scholarship from The International Latham Foundation, the Banff School of Fine Arts Scholarship, the Standard Oil Scholarship, and National Home Study Art Course.

Jackson attend San Francisco State University (SFSU), where she studied both art and ballet, eventually receiving a BA degree in painting. She worked at San Francisco State University alongside San Francisco Bay Area artists and teachers, including Charles White. While at SFSU, Jackson installed exhibitions at the campus art gallery and taught art at St. Stephen's Catholic School.

She later completed an MFA degree in 1990 from the School of Drama, Yale University, specializing in theater design.

Career

1960s–1970s 

After college Jackson toured South America with a ballet company  and later returned to California to settle in Echo Park. In 1968, she opened Gallery 32, which operated for two years and which Jackson funded herself. Jackson held several solo exhibitions during the 1970s at Ankrum Gallery, which was run by actress-turned-gallerist Joan Wheeler Ankrum and actor William Challee. Jackson produced artists books of poetry and painting, "What I Love" (1972) and "Animals" (1978). (see Poetry)“When Bernie [Casey] brought to the gallery several of Suzanne’s paintings, I was immediately struck with the freshness and originality of her work. It is most unusual to find so young an artist with a valid philosophical statement (and to communicate it successfully). Her feelings about her blackness are expressed in somewhat symbolic terms, and her world of fantasy, love and hope is revealed to the viewer in a very refreshing style… She very well may be the first Black woman in America to make a truly important contribution to art.”      -- Joan Ankrum (1/5/1974)

1980s–1990s 
In 1981, Jackson was first introduced to Savannah, Georgia, through an invitation to be a visiting artist with Savannah College of Art and Design through the recommendation of Bernie Casey. Additionally, in 1981, Jackson's work was included in the exhibition “Forever Free: African American Women” which traveled to the Gibbes Museum of Art in Charleston, South Carolina. Jackson lived in Idyllwild, California, from 1981 to 1985 and was on faculty as a Visiting Artist at the Idyllwild School of Music and Arts (1981–1982), and chair of the Fine and Performing Arts at the Elliott-Pope Preparatory School (formerly Desert Sun School) (1982–1985).

In 1987, Jackson relocated to New Haven, Connecticut, to attend Yale University, pursuing a master's degree under the tutelage of Ming Cho Lee for scenography. She worked as a freelance scenic and costume designer moving throughout the region; until taking a post at St. Mary's College of Maryland as a scenographer and assistant professor from 1994 to 1996. In 1996, Jackson moved full-time to Savannah, Georgia, to teach at Savannah College of Art and Design as professor of painting, where she taught full-time until 2009.

2000s–present 
Jackson officially retired from SCAD in 2009, but Jackson remained as a part-time and adjunct professor until 2013. Additionally, Jackson taught introductory art history courses, including African American Art History at Savannah State University in 2013–2014 school year. Jackson has remained an active member of the Savannah artistic community and continues to create and exhibit her work. Jackson co-hosts a weekly radio show featuring jazz and conversation, called Listen Hear on WHCJ 90.3 Savannah State University Radio, alongside Ike Carter, Jerome Meadows, Tom Van de Ven, Lisa Jackson and Carla Curran, PhD. In 2019 Jackson was the recipient of a Joan Mitchell Painters & Sculptors Grant.

Artistic practice
Suzanne Jackson has had an extensive career an emphasized the importance of living the lifestyle of an artist, in her words, to be an artist is to solve problems as opposed to create images. She states, “I'm not an artist yet. I'm a painter. And I draw, and I work in theater as an "artist person," in quotes. But to become an artist takes a whole lifetime.” Throughout her career, Jackson has looked to nature for inspiration, she has consistently related blackness to nature. Her work has celebrated blackness through the representation of black bodies without an overtly political message.

Visual arts 
Jackson has worked in a variety of visual media including works on paper, works on canvas, and Monoprints. Her works on paper include both watercolors and drawings from throughout her career. Jackson has worked mostly with acrylic paint, her earliest paintings on canvas were with acrylic paint layered, the way one would layer oils paints. She stated, “the imagery that everybody has sort of become familiar with, with the really strong white background and the sort of washy layers and layers of paint—that basically is kind of an old masters technique of layering the color for translucency. It's like the layers and layers of color build a depth in the painting. And some of the paintings, as thin as the color looks, there could be a hundred and fifty layers of color on each of my paintings.” The 1990s marked a shift in her work as she began to experiment with different combinations of media.  As her style progressed, Jackson began to forego the canvas in favor of netting as a substrate. She uses Novacolor brand acrylic gels to create 3-dimensional hanging works held together by fabric, papers, found objects, leaves, and or various netting.

Her visual art work is included in public museum collections including at the Museum of Modern Art, California African American Museum, the Indianapolis Museum of Art, and the Hammer Museum at UCLA.

Theater and costume design 
Jackson graduated from Yale in 1990 and traveled the Northeast region (Connecticut, New York, and Philadelphia) as well as parts of California (Los Angeles and San Francisco Bay Area) working as a freelance Scenic and Costume Designer. Her costume designs were included in the exhibition Onstage: A Century of African American Stage Design, at the Library for the Performing Arts, Lincoln Center, New York. Among other regional theatre credits, Jackson's work includes:

BLUES ROOM, Realto Theatre, National Black Arts Festival, Atlanta, Georgia, originating from the Theatre of the First Amendment, George Mason University, Fairfax Virginia, 1997
THE SNOW QUEEN, origin, The John F. Kennedy Center, Scenic and Costume design for the touring company, 1996–98
CHILDREN OF THE SUN, The John F. Kennedy Center, Costume design, 1996–98
Scenographer at St. Mary's College of Maryland, (Tartuffe, Fefu and Her friends, The Physicists, The Bigger Picture, Happy End, Etta Jenks, In Perpetuity Throughout the Universe) 1994-96
 STAMPING, SHOUTING, AND SINGING HOME, Mark Taper Forum,1993
BOSEMAN AND LENA at the Philadelphia Drama Guild 1990
PERICLES and DAYLIGHT IN EXILE at Yale Repertory Theatre 1990
ROSE OF THE RANCHO, El Teatro Campesino, 1989
all costumes for Barbara Feldman & Dancers, 1988–96
 THE WINTER'S TALE and MACBETH at California Shakespeare Festival
designs for Gus Solomons, Company Dance, Jennifer Muller/The Works

Dance 
Jackson studied ballet and choreography at university, while a student she was a member of the Pacific Ballet Company (1961–66). Following graduation from college, Jackson participated in a State Department musical theatre tour of South America with Music Theatre U.S.A., and upon returning, Jackson was an instructor of dance and art at Watts Towers Art Center in Los Angeles from 1968 to 1969. From 1982 to 1985, Jackson was the chair of the fine arts department of the Elliot‑Pope Preparatory School, Idyllwild, California, where she choreographed performances including Oliver!, Grease, and the Cosmic Festival.

Poetry 
Jackson's poetry has been mentored by the Cave Canem Foundation, Lucille Clifton, St Mary's Women's Writing Group, and the International Women's Writing Guild. Jackson's published artist books featuring her poetry and paintings are “Animal,” and “What I Love.” Jackson's poetry and drawings are included in Cave Canem Anthologies; “the ringing ear: Black Poets Lean South,” 2007,  I, II, and IV, 1996–99; Avatar 25, 1996; Potomac Review,  Winter 1996; In the Valley of the Moon, International Women's Writing Guild, 1994.

Several of her Artist Statements are written in verse: MY ART DEALS WITH REALITY

VERSUS FANTASY--- ALONENESS

VERSUS LONLINESS… WHAT I

PAINT ATTEMPTS TO EXPRESS THE

CONFLICTS WITHIN THE MIND,

CONFLICTS OF CHOICES--- OF LOVES,

---OF SENSITIVITIES SEARCHING,

ORDERING, “FREEING” ONESELF

TOWARD SOME CONTINUOUS

CYCLE OF REDISCOVERING WHO,

IN FACT, I MIGHT REALLY BE.

--Statement from Suzanne Jackson’s book, What I Love (1970)

Gallery 32 
Many associate Jackson's name with Gallery 32, an art gallery she ran in MacArthur Park, Los Angeles from 1968 to 1970, dedicated to fostering a supportive artist community. Gallery 32 was inspired by artist Charles White's philosophy that art could be an effective vehicle for community activism and social change. Seeking to replicate Jackson's previous experiences of San Francisco bohemianism, Gallery 32 functioned less as a business than as a place for the exchange of ideas and philosophies. Jackson funded the gallery herself, largely with money she earned from teaching. The gallery became an important venue, hosting discussions, poetry readings, and fund-raisers for social causes, and exhibiting work that demonstrated strong political and civic engagement. She aimed to make art from black artists with black themes accessible for all members of the community. It quickly became one of the few art spaces in Los Angeles to exhibit emerging African American artists such as Gloria Bohanon, Emory Douglas, David Hammons, Betye Saar, and Timothy Washington. Among the organizations for which the gallery hosted fundraisers were the Black Arts Council, the Black Panther Party, and the Watts Towers Arts Center children's arts program. One of the gallery's important exhibitions was the 1970 Sapphire Show, the first Los Angeles survey of African American women artists. Gallery 32 played a vital role in the progressive struggles of the period while contributing to the diverse art scene of Los Angeles. The remaining artworks and ephemera have been promised to the Getty Research Institute per the artist's request.

Teaching 
 2014–2016, Adjunct Professor of Foundation Studies, Drawing, Savannah College of Art and Design, Savannah, Georgia
 2013–2014, Adjunct Professor of Fine Arts, Sabbatical Replacement History I & II; African American Art History, Savannah State University, Savannah, Georgia
 2009–2013, Adjunct Professor of Painting (eLearning), Graduate Studies, Savannah College of Art and Design, Savannah, Georgia
 1996–2009, Professor of Painting, Savannah College of Art and Design, Savannah, Georgia
 1994–1996, Scenographer and Assistant Professor, St. Mary's College of Maryland, St. Mary's City, Maryland
 1982–1985, Chair of the Fine and Performing Arts Department, the Elliott‑Pope Preparatory School, (formerly the Desert Sun School), Idyllwild, California.
 1972, Stanford University (summer), Stanford, California
 1970, dance and crafts instructor, Watts Tower Art Center, Watts, California

Exhibitions
Below is a select list of notable exhibitions by Jackson.

Further reading 
 Bustion, Nathanial. The Eternal Genetic Presence and the Creative Transformation. CA: Aton Mattinnii Fine Arts Studio/ Asaraset Institute, 2015.
 Finch, Richard. Marks from the Matrix: Normal Editions Workshop Collaborative Limited Edition Prints 1976-2006. IL:Normal Editions Workshop, Illinois State University, 2007.
 Goode-Bryant, Linda, and Marcy S. Phillips, eds. Contextures. Exh. cat. New York: Just Above Midtown Gallery, 1978.
 Jackson, Suzanne. Animal. Los Angeles: Continuity Transcripts and Features, 1978.
 Jones, Kellie. South of Pico: African American Artists in Los Angeles in the 1960s and 1970s. Durham. North Carolina: Duke University Press, 2017.
 LeFalle-Collins, Lizzetta, and Cecil Fergerson. 19Sixties: A Cultural Awakening Re-evaluated, 1965–1975. Exh. cat. Los Angeles: California Afro-American Museum Foundation, 1989.
 Lewis, Samella S. Art: African American, 161–62. New York: Harcourt Brace Jovanovich, 1978.
 Peter, Carolyn, and Damon Willick. Gallery 32 and Its Circle. Exh. cat. Los Angeles: Loyola Marymount University, 2009.
 Tate, Mae. "The Art of Suzanne Jackson." Black Art Quarterly 4, no. 3 (1982): 3–21.
 Widener, Daniel. Black Arts West: Culture and Struggle in Postwar Los Angeles. Durham, N.C.: Duke University Press, 2010.

References

External links 
 Official Site: http://www.suzannejackson.art
 Interview with Suzanne Jackson, 1980 July, from Archives of American Art, Smithsonian Institution
 Interview of Suzanne Jackson, 1992 August, from TEI Project, UCLA Library Oral Histories
 Video: Murs Murs by Agnès Varda
 Video: Netropolitan Interview

1944 births
Living people
21st-century American women artists
20th-century American women artists
African-American women artists
American contemporary artists
American poets
Dancers from Missouri
Scenographers
African-American female dancers
African-American poets
American female dancers
African-American art dealers
American art dealers
Women art dealers
Artists from St. Louis
San Francisco State University alumni
Yale School of Drama alumni
20th-century African-American women
20th-century African-American artists
21st-century African-American women